Padmesh is a Indian Tamil film cinematographer.

Filmography

As cinematographer
 Murugaa (2007)
 Thiruvanamalai (2008)
 Muran (2011)
 Kochadaiyaan (2014)
 Chithiram Pesuthadi 2 (2019)
 Vallavanukkum Vallavan (2023)

References

Cinematographers from Tamil Nadu
1974 births
Living people
People from Kanyakumari district
Tamil film cinematographers